is an Apollo near-Earth asteroid first observed by astronomer Alex R. Gibbs of the Mount Lemmon Survey with a 1.5-meter reflecting telescope on 28 May 2012.

Overview

The asteroid had a close approach to the Earth on 29 May 2012, approaching to only ~8950 miles (~14,440 km) above the planet's surface. This means  came inside the Clarke Belt of geosynchronous satellites. In May 2012, the estimated 5- to 10-metre-wide asteroid ranked #6 on the top 20 list of closest-approaches to Earth.

It is estimated that an impact would produce an upper atmosphere air burst equivalent to 11 kt TNT, roughly equal to Hiroshima's Little Boy. The asteroid would be vaporized as these small impacts occur approximately once per year. A comparable-sized object caused the Sutter's Mill meteorite in California on 2 April 2012. It was removed from the Sentry Risk Table on 30 May 2012.

References

External links 
 JPL Small-Body Database Browser for 2012 KT42
 2012 KT42 - Close Approach (Remanzacco Observatory in Italy)
 Images from Flyby (spaceweather.com)
 MPEC 2012-K66 : 2012 KT42 (Minor Planet Center Discovery announcement)
 Planetary Defense Blog post on 2012 KT42
 Video: Tiny Asteroid 2012 KT42 Crossing The Sky (universetoday 29 May 2012)
 The Peculiar Flyby of Asteroid 2012 KT42 (Pasquale Tricarico : 29 May 2012)
 
 
 

Minor planet object articles (unnumbered)

20120529
20120528